Hussain Sadiqi is a Hazara Australian actor and martial artist. He won an award for the best fight scene for the Australian made action movie Among Dead Men at International Film Festival in Pasadena, California. An athlete in Afghanistan, Sadiqi left as the Taliban arrived and landed in Australia as a refuge in 1999 at Port Hedland Detention Centre.

Biography
He was born on 1981 in the central highlands of Afghanistan in Urozgan (Daykundi). He began his Martial Arts training when he was 9 years old. He attained the top ranking Martial Arts position in Afghanistan at a young age and become the National Champion at the age of 16. At 18 he became the captain of Afghanistan National Team. In 1999 he had to flee Afghanistan because of war; he had become a Taliban target due to his high profile. Soon after arriving in Australia he was sent to a Detention Center for six months until he was released on a temporary protection visa. After being released he was selected to compete for the Afghan Tae Kwon Do team at the 2000 Sydney Olympic Games and carry his country flag at the Opening Ceremony. A couple of days before the Games started the International Olympic Committee banned the Afghan team because the Taliban, which controlled Afghanistan at the time, would not allow women compete.

Hussain gained many fans with his Martial arts based documentary "The Art of Fighting". 

In 2008 he won an award for the best fight scene for in an action movie for "Among the Dead Men" at the Action on Film International Film Festival in Pasadena, California. The award was for the best action in a Feature Film.

In 2012 Hussain came back to win the Kung Fu World Championship at the age of 33.

See also 

 Hazara Australians
 Afghan Australians
 List of Hazara people

References

External links 
 

Hazara artists
Hazara sportspeople
Australian people of Hazara descent
People from Urozgan Province
Living people
1981 births
Naturalised citizens of Australia